Forza! Nederland (an abbreviation of Fortuynistische Organisatie voor een Realistische Zakelijke Aanpak) is a Dutch right-wing populist political organisation active in the Netherlands. Despite the name, the party has no connection nor is part of Forza Italia.
Forza! is active in several municipalities in the Netherlands and was represented in the States-Provincial of North Holland until 2015.
Forza! is known to be the successor of the former Pim Fortuyn List and very outspoken against Islam, refugees and for referendums and can be considered as a local counterpart of the Party for Freedom and Forum voor Democratie although Forza! denies this.

History

2003–2009 
The party's history began in 2003 when Paul Meijer and Fleur Agema were disbarred from the States-Provincial Pim Fortuyn List. Meijer and Agema founded the party to participate in the 2006 elections, but failed to raise the money needed to participate. In 2006 Agema left the party and joined the Party for Freedom of Geert Wilders. Forza! participated in the 2006 Dutch municipal elections but won no seats in any municipalities.

Forza! tried to cooperate with Rita Verdonk's Trots op Nederland  but the differences between the two could not be resolved.

2010–2014 
In the Dutch municipal elections of 2010, Forza! only participated in two municipalities: Haarlemmermeer and Haarlem. In Haarlem the party won no seats. In Haarlemmermeer the party won 3 seats in the town council. Forza! chairman Paul Meijer became the house leader.

In late 2012, Forza! Netherlands also had a seat in the States-Provincial of North Holland. Monica Nunes switched from the Party for Freedom to Forza! and represented the political organisation. In 2015 she was disbarred after not showing up in the state-provincial for almost a year. Forza! didn't return in the States-Provincial to give the PVV a chance to grow. The party later officially declared that they were against the form of a States-Provincial and wanted to abolish this.

In 2014 Forza! announced that the organisation didn't want to participate in national elections anymore and only will be active in various municipalities in the Netherlands.
At the Municipal elections of 2014, the party grew from 3 to 4 seats in Haarlemmermeer, but lost two of them six months later after a conflict between Paul Meijer and two councillors. 
The party also participated in Velsen as Forza! IJmond and won 2 seats.

2015–2019 
In 2015 a councillor of a local party in Spijkenisse joined Forza! and also in 2016 a councillor in Castricum joined the party, making Forza! represented in four different municipalities. 
In 2017 Forza! chairman Paul Meijer announced that the party would also participate in the municipalities Maassluis and Enschede at the municipal elections in 2018. But the local leaders of the two cities stopped their campaigns just before the elections.

In 2018 Forza! won one seat in the city of Castricum and went from two to three seats in the city of Velsen. In the city of Spijkenisse, Forza! lost all her seats. The elections in Haarlemmermeer are held in November 2018.

Since 2020 
In 2020, a battle of directions broke out in the party. Some board members accused Paul Meijer of abusing the fraction budget. After an integrity report was made against him to the municipality, he was placed on non-active status. The faction in Haarlemmmermeer fell apart into different camps. In January 2021, two separated members returned to the group and Meijer was expelled from the group. Both Meijer and the other board members subsequently claimed to represent the party.

Organization
Till 2014 Forza! was a party with members and people could be a member. After 2014 the party disabled new member registration and the only members are the board members of the party, Paul Meijer.

References 

2003 establishments in the Netherlands
Anti-Islam political parties in Europe
Political parties in the Netherlands
National liberal parties
Eurosceptic parties in the Netherlands
Secularism in the Netherlands
Liberal parties in the Netherlands
Nationalist parties in the Netherlands
Political parties established in 2003
Right-wing populism in the Netherlands
Right-wing populist parties
Anti-Islam sentiment in the Netherlands